Aarrestad is a Norwegian surname. Notable people with the surname include:

Sven Aarrestad (1850–1942), Norwegian writer and politician
Unn Aarrestad (born 1938), Norwegian politician

See also
Henrik Aarrestad Uldalen (born 1986), Norwegian oil painter

Norwegian-language surnames